The 1890 All-Ireland Senior Hurling Championship was the fourth staging of the All-Ireland hurling championship since its establishment by the Gaelic Athletic Association in 1887. The championship began on 3 August 1890 and ended on 16 November 1890.

Dublin were the defending champions, however, they were defeated in the provincial series. Cork won the title, after successfully launching an objection having originally been beaten by Wexford in the final.

Teams

A total of eleven teams contested the championship, one more than the previous year.

The Leinster championship was contested by five teams. Kildare made a return to the championship after a one-year absence, however, they failed to field a team and gave a walkover to their opponents.

All six counties entered a team in the Munster championship, however, a number of walkovers meant that only two games were played.

Once again, the hurling championship was not contested in either Connacht or Ulster.

Team summaries

Results

Leinster Senior Hurling Championship

Munster Senior Hurling Championship

All-Ireland Senior Hurling Championship

Championship statistics

Miscellaneous

 The Leinster quarter-final between Wexford and Kilkenny was played in Waterford. It was the first time that a game from the Leinster championship was played at a Munster venue. 
 In the provincial championships Cork win their first Munster title and Wexford win their first Leinster title.
 The All-Ireland final between Cork and Wexford was the first championship meeting between the two teams.  The game was unfinished and Cork awarded the title after Cork withdraw on the grounds of excessively rough play by the opposition.

Sources

 Corry, Eoghan, The GAA Book of Lists (Hodder Headline Ireland, 2005).
 Donegan, Des, The Complete Handbook of Gaelic Games (DBA Publications Limited, 2005).

External links
 1890 All-Ireland Senior Hurling Championship results

References

1890
All-Ireland Senior Hurling Championship